{{Infobox person
| name         = Thelma Tixou
| image        = Thelma Tixou.jpeg
| caption      = Thelma Tixou in 1976
| birth_name   = Thelma Delia Suklenik Snopik
| birth_date   = 
| birth_place  = Buenos Aires, Argentina
| death_date   = 
| death_place  = Mexico City, Mexico
| death_cause  = 
| resting_place = 
| other_names  = La Muchacha del Cuerpo de Oro (The Girl of the Golden Body)| occupation   = 
| years_active = 1965–2019
| nationality  = 
| spouse       = 
| children     = 
}}
Thelma Delia Suklenik Snopik (1944 – 15 January 2019), better known by her stage name Thelma Tixou, was a Mexican vedette and actress of Argentine origin. She was one of the most popular Mexican vedettes during the 1970s and 1980s.

Biography
Early years
Of Lithuanian origin on her mother's side, Tixou studied for six years in the Teatro Labardén, in Buenos Aires, Argentina. She was a very good jazz dancer. At age 13 she started her career as vedette. Eventually, Tixou is presented in a contest at the Teatro Nacional Cervantes of Buenos Aires, and was chosen among 10 dancers to fill the role of vedette.

 Career
She was star of such Argentine Revues as Radiolandia, Antena and Ellas. She also had the opportunity to share the stage with the great vedette Tita Merello. She was a First Vedette of the Teatro Maipo, the Teatro Nacional and the Teatro Astral, where she alternated with other vedettes, including Zulma Faiad and Nélida Roca. Tixou made her television debut in 1965 in the popular TV show La matraca. In 1967, she appeared on film as star of the comedy La Muchacha del cuerpo de oro, a nickname by which she became known through her glory years.

Tixou arrived in Mexico contracted by artistic agent Angel Shuger for only 45 days because she also received an offer to work at the famous cabaret Le Lido in Paris. She debuted with great success in the famous Teatro Blanquita of Mexico City. Thelma was the main star of famous Mexican cabarets such as El Capri or El Clóset for several years. Tixou decided to settle in Mexico. During her most successful years, Tixou managed to earn $15,000 dollars a month.

Along with her work in nightclubs and cabarets, Tixou also participated in a large number of plays and theater performances with actors and comedians such as Chabelo, Gustavo Rojo, Alberto "El Caballo" Rojas, Lalo "el Mimo", Jaime Fernández and others. On television she was also part of the cast of the famous program Siempre en Domingo with Raúl Velasco.

In 1984, Tixou starred in the movie La superdotada with the singer King Clave. In 1989, Tixou achieved international fame thanks to her participation in the film Santa Sangre, by the filmmaker Alejandro Jodorowsky. In 2001, the actress debuted in the Mexican telenovelas in the melodrama Salomé. Since then, Tixou has appeared in several Mexican TV series.

Personal life
Thelma Tixou married her manager and agent, an ex-boxer with whom she suffered various physical and verbal abuses. Her husband abandoned her, leaving her in economic ruin. Tixou subsequently endured but emerged from severe depression. She died on 15 January 2019 at the age of 75 in Mexico City from a brain tumor.

Filmography
Films
 La muchacha del cuerpo de oro (1967)
 La superdotada (1984)
 Santa Sangre (1989)
 Cándido Pérez, especialista en señoras (1991)

Television
 La matraca (1965)
 Variedades de medianoche (1977)
 Siempre en Domingo (1977)
 Hasta que la muerte los separe (1994)
 Salomé  (2001)
 Las Vías del Amor (2002)
 Pablo y Andrea (2005)
 Central de Abasto (2009)
 Porque el amor manda'' (2012)

References

External links
 

1944 births
2019 deaths
Argentine emigrants to Mexico
Mexican film actresses
Mexican vedettes
People from Buenos Aires
Deaths from brain tumor
Deaths from cancer in Mexico
Argentine people of Lithuanian descent
Mexican people of Lithuanian descent
Date of birth missing